Politics in West Bengal is dominated by the following major political parties: the All India Trinamool Congress, the Bharatiya Janata Party, the Communist Party of India (Marxist), and the Indian National Congress. For many decades, the state underwent gruesome and terrible political violence.

Government
West Bengal is governed through a parliamentary system of representative democracy, a feature the state shares with other Indian states. Universal suffrage is granted to residents. There are two branches of government. The legislature, the West Bengal Legislative Assembly, consists of elected members and special office bearers such as the Speaker and Deputy Speaker, who are elected by the members. Assembly meetings are presided over by the Speaker or the Deputy Speaker in the Speaker's absence. The judiciary is composed of the Calcutta High Court and a system of lower courts. Executive authority is vested in the Council of Ministers headed by the Chief Minister although the titular head of government is the Governor. The Governor is the head of state appointed by the President of India. The leader of the party or coalition with a majority in the Legislative Assembly is appointed as the Chief Minister by the Governor, and the Council of Ministers are appointed by the Governor on the advice of the Chief Minister. The Council of Ministers reports to the Legislative Assembly. The Assembly is unicameral with 295 Members of the Legislative Assembly, or MLAs, including one nominated from the Anglo-Indian community. Terms of office run for five years, unless the Assembly is dissolved prior to the completion of the term. Auxiliary authorities known as panchayats, for which local body elections are regularly held, govern local affairs. The state contributes 42 seats to the Lok Sabha and 16 seats to the Rajya Sabha of the Indian Parliament.

History 
The area's early history featured a succession of Indian empires, internal squabbling, and a tussle between Hinduism and Buddhism for dominance. Ancient Bengal was the site of several major Janapadas (kingdoms), while the earliest cities date back to the Vedic period. The region was part of several ancient pan-Indian empires, including the Mauryans and Guptas. It was also a bastion of regional kingdoms. The citadel of Gauda served as the capital of the Gauda Kingdom, the Buddhist Pala Empire (eighth to 11th century) and Hindu Sena Empire (11th–12th century). From the 13thcentury onward, the region was ruled by several sultans, powerful Hindu states, and Baro-Bhuyan landlords, until the beginning of British rule in the 18thcentury. The British East India Company cemented their hold on the region following the Battle of Plassey in 1757, and Calcutta served for many years as the capital of British India. The early and prolonged exposure to British administration resulted in an expansion of Western education, culminating in developments in science, institutional education, and social reforms in the region, including what became known as the Bengali Renaissance. A hotbed of the Indian independence movement through the early 20thcentury, Bengal was divided during India's independence in 1947 along religious lines into two separate entities: West Bengal, a state of India, and East Bengal, a province of Pakistan which later became independent Bangladesh.

Indian National Congress rule(1947–1962)

Princely state merge with West Bengal
In 1950, the Princely State of Koch Bihar merged with West Bengal after King Jagaddipendra Narayan had signed the Instrument of Accession with India. In 1955, the former French enclave of Chandannagar, which had passed into Indian control after 1950, was integrated into West Bengal. Portions (the then Manbhum) of Bihar were  subsequently merged with West Bengal and now this region serves as the district of Purulia 

During Bidhan Chandra Roy's Chief Minister-ship a number of manufacturing industries were set up in the state. He had a dream of developing West Bengal into one of the greatest regions of India. Bidhan Roy is often considered 'The Maker of Modern West Bengal' due to his key role in the founding of several institutions and five eminent cities in the state: Durgapur, Kalyani, Bidhannagar, Ashokenagar and Habra. Even after being the Chief Minister of West Bengal, Dr. B. C. Roy used to treat patients and never gave up his profession of a doctor. In 1954, a massive food crisis overtook the state.

United Front (1967–1969)

After the state legislative elections held in 1967, the CPI(M) was the main force behind the United Front government formed. The post of Chief Minister was given to Ajoy Mukherjee of the Bangla Congress.

Naxalbari uprising

In 1967 a peasant uprising broke out in Naxalbari, in northern West Bengal. The insurgency was led by hardline district-level CPI(M) leaders Charu Majumdar and Kanu Sanyal. The Naxalbari movement was violently repressed by the West Bengal government. During the 1970s and 1980s, severe power shortages, strikes and a violent Marxist-Naxalite movement damaged much of the state's infrastructure, leading to a period of economic stagnation.

The Bangladesh Liberation War of 1971 resulted in the influx of millions of refugees to West Bengal, causing significant strains on its infrastructure. The government was credited for handling the refugee crisis fairly well by the International media. The 1974 smallpox epidemic killed thousands of people. West Bengal politics underwent a major change when the Left Front won the 1977 assembly election, defeating the incumbent Indian National Congress. The Left Front, led by Communist Party of India (Marxist), had governed for the state for the subsequent three and a half decades.

1969 Assembly election
Fresh elections were held in West Bengal in 1969. CPI(M) emerged as the largest party in the West Bengal legislative assembly.  But with the active support of CPI and the Bangla Congress, Ajoy Mukherjee was returned as Chief Minister of the state. Mukherjee resigned on March 16, 1970 and the state was put under President's Rule.

Indian National Congress rule  II (1972–1977)
Indian National Congress won the 1972 assembly election, and its leader Siddhartha Shankar Ray became the chief minister. He wanted to erase every single Naxal from West Bengal but his and his government's actions backfired, creating state-wide outrage against him and the then West Bengal Government. During this period, the then Prime Minister of India, Indira Gandhi proclaimed nationwide Emergency in 1975.

This period was marked by large scale violence as the police force battled with the Naxalites in the state of West Bengal.

Left Front rule (1977–2011)

In the 1977 West Bengal Legislative Assembly election, the Left Front, headed by Communist Party of India (Marxist), won 231 seats thereby gaining a majority, reducing the Indian National Congress to a mere 20 seats. The first Left Front government was established with Jyoti Basu as the Chief Minister. The state saw rapid developments in this period, with the Land Reforms and the Panchayat System being two of the many notable ones. In this time, the state had become one of the leaders in agricultural output, being the leading producer of rice and the second leading producer of potatoes.

The Naxalite movement was crushed during this time.

Major incidents

1979 Marichjhanpi Massacre

The massacre in Marichjhanpi, which took place under CPI(M) rule in Bengal between January 26 and May 16, 1979, relates to the eviction of refugees from the reserved island of Marichjhanpi, Sunderbans, who had fled from East Pakistan thereby leading to the death of a sizable population among them.

After leading the Left Front government for consecutive five terms, Jyoti Basu retired from active politics and Buddhadeb Bhattacharjee was appointed as his successor. In 2000, the Left Front came back to the power with Buddhadeb Bhattacharjee again assuming the office of the Chief Minister.

The state's economic recovery gathered momentum after economic reforms in India were introduced in the early 1990s by the central government, aided by election of a new reformist Chief Minister Buddhadeb Bhattacharjee in 2000. About during 2007, armed activists, and Maoists have been organizing terrorist attacks in some parts of the state, while clashes with the administration have taken place at several sensitive places on the issue of industrial land acquisition.

Singur Tata Nano controversy
The Bhattacharjee government wanted to set up a Tata Nano factory in Singur, Hooghly. However, All India Trinamool Congress leader Mamata Banerjee manipulated the situation.This led to the eviction of the Tatas from the state and shifting the factory to Sanand in Gujarat after Ratan Tata received a call from the then Chief Minister of Gujarat, Narendra Modi. This halted Bhattacharjee's aim of industrializing West Bengal.

Nandigram violence

The Nandigram violence was an incident in Nandigram, West Bengal where, under the orders of the Left Front government, more than 4,000 heavily armed police stormed the Nandigram area with the aim of stamping out protests against the West Bengal government's plans to expropriate  of land for a Special Economic Zone (SEZ) to be developed by the Indonesian-based Salim Group. The area of Nandigram had turned into an internal-security threat for the country. The Trinamool Congress, collaborating with the Maoists, had isolated the entire area from the rest of the country, by cutting up all the roads and blocking them by tree trunks. Weapons were being collected and stored for an armed rebellion. The villagers were brainwashed against the Government and the progressive scheme. However, the shootings, in recent developments have proved to be a conspiracy of the TMC and Maoists alike. Indeed the police had to resort to firing when the armed mob refused to disperse even after much persuasion and  tear gassing and started attacking the police. The then Chief Minister, Buddhadeb Bhattacharya was awarded a clean-chit for non-involvement in the Nandigram violence by the CBI. The police shot 13 villagers dead and one died from a very suspicious knife-attack, thus sparking controversies whether the police were, in the least, the ones to fire. At least 30 police officers were injured in the incident.

The SEZ controversy started when the government of West Bengal decided that the Salim Group of Indonesia would set up a chemical hub under the SEZ policy at Nandigram, a rural area in the district of Purba Medinipur. The villagers took over the administration of the area and all the roads to the villages were cut off.

All India Trinamool Congress rule (2011–present)
In the 2011 West Bengal Legislative Assembly election, the Left Front was defeated by the All India Trinamool Congress which won an absolute majority of seats. This led to the end of 34 year Communist rule in West Bengal as well as the end of the longest serving democratically elected Communist government in the world. Mamata Banerjee, the leader of Trinamool Congress, became the chief minister. The success of the Trinamool Congress was repeated in the 2016 West Bengal Legislative Assembly election.

Under this administration, famous scandals include:

 Saradha Group financial scandal (started circa 2000; arrest started 2013)
 Rose Valley financial scandal (hit headlines in 2013)
 Narada Sting Operation (done in 2014; came into light in 2016)
 Coal Scam Case (May 2020)
 Cattle Smuggling Racket 

During the 2019 Indian General election, the BJP won 18 Lok Sabha seats sweeping the vote share of the Congress and the Left while the TMC, in spite of losing seats, increased their vote share.
But in the 2021 West Bengal Legislative Assembly election, TMC secured a massive victory off 215 seats out of 294 seats.

See also

Government of West Bengal
Chief Minister of West Bengal
List of political parties in India

Notes and references